Washoe Lake State Park is a year-round public recreation area occupying  on the southeast shore of Washoe Lake in Washoe County, Nevada. The area around the park is known for its high winds making Washoe Lake a popular destination for windsurfers.

History
The first known inhabitants of the area in and surrounding Washoe State Park were the Washoe people. The Washoe would generally spend the winter in the lowlands of the Washoe Valley and summer on the shores of Lake Tahoe. The Washoe used cattails and willows from the shores of Washoe Lake to make baskets.

White settlers arrived on a permanent basis in the area soon after the discovery of silver in the Comstock Lode near Virginia City in 1859. The find brought thousands of traders, loggers, and miners to the Washoe Valley. Franktown, west of Washoe Lake, was established by Mormon pioneers in the same year. Two silver processing mills were built near the lake. Ophir Mill was built on Washoe Lake's western shore and the New York Mill was built beside Little Washoe Lake. The remnants of both mills can be seen today.

The Virginia and Truckee Railroad was built through the valley in 1872. It connected Reno with Carson City. This railroad remained in operation until 1950. The mining boom was over by the end of the 1870s and many of the early settlers left the area. Those that remained began ranching and farming the land. The Washoe people were not fully displaced from their traditional lands until the farms and ranches took hold in the Washoe Valley.

Washoe Lake State Park was opened on the southern and eastern shores of the lake in 1977. It was established to preserve the scenic beauty of the area for future generations. The cities of Reno and Carson City are encroaching on the lands of Washoe Lake State Park, but its protected status ensures that the park will remain in its natural state for years to come. Commonly seen wildlife include mule deer, hawk, coyotes, and eagles.

Activities and amenities
Recreational opportunities at the park include picnicking facilities, boat launches, a 49-site campground, equestrian area, and several miles of trails open to foot, horse, and ATV traffic. A large group pavilion has a beach volleyball pit and horseshoe pit nearby. The park is open to hunting during the designated hunting seasons. The lake has been stocked by the Nevada Division of Wildlife since 2004 when Washoe Lake last dried up.

In popular culture
One of the scenes from John Wayne's final film The Shootist was filmed at the park.

References

External links

Washoe Lake State Park Nevada State Parks
Washoe Lake State Park Trail Map Nevada State Parks

State parks of Nevada
Protected areas established in 1977
Protected areas of Washoe County, Nevada
1977 establishments in Nevada